The sonatas and partitas for solo violin (BWV 1001–1006) are a set of six works composed by Johann Sebastian Bach. The set consists of three sonatas da chiesa in four movements and three partitas (or partias) in dance-form movements. The 2nd Partita is widely known for its Chaconne, considered one of the most masterly and expressive works ever written for solo violin.

The set was completed by 1720 but was not published until 1802 by Nikolaus Simrock in Bonn. Even after publication, it was largely ignored until the celebrated violinist Joseph Joachim started performing these works. Today, Bach's Sonatas and Partitas are an essential part of the violin repertoire, and they are frequently performed and recorded.

The Sei Solo a Violino senza Basso accompagnato (Six Solos for Violin Without Bass Accompaniment), as Bach titled them, firmly established the technical capability of the violin as a solo instrument. The pieces often served as archetypes for solo violin pieces by later generations of composers, including Eugène Ysaÿe and Béla Bartók.

History of composition 
The surviving autograph manuscript of the sonatas and partitas was made by Bach in 1720 in Köthen, where he was Kapellmeister. As Christoph Wolff comments, the paucity of sources for instrumental compositions prior to Bach's period in Leipzig makes it difficult to establish a precise chronology; 

The goal of producing a polyphonic texture governed by the rules of counterpoint also indicates the influence of the first surviving works of this kind for solo violin, Westhoff's partitas for solo violin composed in 1696. The virtuoso violinist Westhoff served as court musician in Dresden from 1674 to 1697 and in Weimar from 1699 until his death in 1705, so Bach would have known him for two years. The repertoire for solo violin was actively growing at the time: Heinrich Ignaz Franz Biber's celebrated solo passacaglia appeared c.1676; Westhoff's collections of solo violin music were published in 1682 and 1696; Johann Joseph Vilsmayr's Artificiosus Concentus pro Camera in 1715, and Johann Georg Pisendel's solo violin sonata was composed around 1716; and finally, Georg Philipp Telemann published 12 Fantasias for solo violin in 1735.

First performance
It is not known whether these violin solos were performed during Bach's lifetime or, if they were, who the performer was. Johann Georg Pisendel and Jean-Baptiste Volumier, both talented violinists in the Dresden court, have been suggested as possible performers, as was Joseph Spiess, leader of the orchestra in Köthen. Friedrich Wilhelm Rust, who would later become part of the Bach family circle in Leipzig, also became a likely candidate. Bach himself was an able violinist from his youth, and his familiarity with the violin and its literature shows in the composition of the set and the very detailed autograph manuscript. According to his son Carl Philipp Emanuel Bach, "in his youth, and until the approach of old age, he played the violin cleanly and powerfully".

Manuscripts and published editions 
Upon Bach's death in 1750, the original manuscript passed into the possession, possibly through his second wife Anna Magdalena, of Johann Christoph Friedrich Bach. It was inherited by the last male descendant of J. C. F. Bach, Wilhelm Friedrich Ernst Bach, who passed it on to his sister Christina Louisa Bach (1762–1852).

Four other early manuscripts also exist. One, originally identified as an authentic Bach autograph from his Leipzig period, is now identified as being a copy dating from 1727–32 by Bach's second wife Anna Magdalena Bach, and is the companion to her copy of the six suites Bach wrote for solo cello.

Another copy, dated July 3, 1726 (the date is on the final page), made by one of Bach's admirers Johann Peter Kellner, is well preserved, despite the fact that the B minor Partita was missing from the set and that there are numerous deviations and omissions. These differences may have come from an earlier source or composing copy, and not necessarily copying errors on Kellner's part. This view is supported by Zoltán Szabó. The three manuscripts are in the Berlin State Museum and have been in the possession of the Bach-Gesellschaft since 1879, through the efforts of Alfred Dörffel. Two other eighteenth century manuscripts, both by unidentified copyists, have also survived.

The first edition was printed in 1802 by Nikolaus Simrock of Bonn. It is clear from errors in it that it was not made with reference to Bach's own manuscript, and it has many mistakes that were frequently repeated in later editions of the 19th century.

Performers 
Virtually every great violin performer has recorded the Sonatas and Partitas, often multiple times, as in the case of Joseph Szigeti, Nathan Milstein, Yehudi Menuhin, Henryk Szeryng, Hilary Hahn and other distinguished players. Strikingly, David Oistrakh, the towering performer of the violin, is not known to have recorded the complete set of Sonatas and Partitas. One of the most famous performers of the Sonatas and Partitas was the violinist and composer George Enescu, who considered this work as "The Himalayas of violinists" and recorded all the sonatas and partitas in the late 1940s. One of his students (Serge Blanc) collected the notes of his master Enescu regarding sonority, phrasing, tempo, fingering and expression, in a now freely distributed document.

Musical structure 

The sonatas each consist of four movements, in the typical slow-fast-slow-fast pattern of the sonata da chiesa. The first two movements of each sonata are a prelude and a fugue. The third (slow) movement is lyrical, while the final movement shares the similar musical structure as a typical binary suite movement. Unlike the sonatas, the partitas are of more unorthodox design. Although still making use of the usual baroque style of allemande, courante, sarabande, and gigue, with some omissions and the addition of galanteries, new elements were introduced into each partita to provide variety.

Alternative scoring 
Aside from the surviving transcriptions BWV 964 and 968, two different sources also indicate that Bach and his circle performed the Sonatas and Partitas on keyboard instruments, rather than on the violin. Music theorist, instrument maker and organ player Jakob Adlung writes (Anleitung zu der musikalischen Gelahrtheit, Erfurt, 1758), regarding the keyboard works by Bach – ”They are actually violini soli senza basso, 3 Sonatas and 3 Partitas, which are well suited for performance on the keyboard”. Johann Friedrich Agricola, who co-wrote Bach's obituary, reports that ”Their composer often played them himself on the clavichord, and added so much harmonies to them, as he found necessary”.

The pieces and their movements

Sonata No. 1 in G minor, BWV 1001 

Though the key signature of the manuscript suggests D minor, such was a notational convention in the Baroque period, and therefore does not necessarily imply that the piece is in the Dorian mode.
The second movement, the fugue, would later be reworked for the organ (in the Prelude and Fugue, BWV 539) and the lute (Fugue, BWV 1000), with the latter being two bars longer than the violin version.

Partita No. 1 in B minor, BWV 1002 

This partita substitutes a bourrée (marked Tempo di Borea) for the gigue. Each movement is followed by a variation (double in French).

Sonata No. 2 in A minor, BWV 1003

Partita No. 2 in D minor, BWV 1004 

In the original manuscript, Bach marked 'Segue la Corrente' at the end of Allemanda. The monumental Chaconne, the last and most famous movement of the suite, was regarded as "the greatest structure for solo violin that exists" by Yehudi Menuhin. It involves a set of variations based on a simple phrase repeated in harmonic progression in the bass line (ground bass).

Sonata No. 3 in C major, BWV 1005 

The opening movement of the work introduced a peaceful, slow stacking up of notes, a technique once thought to be impossible on bowed instruments. The fugue is the most complex and extensive of the three, with the subject derived from the chorale Komm, heiliger Geist, Herre Gott. Bach employs many contrapuntal techniques, including a stretto, an inversion, as well as diverse examples of double counterpoint.

Partita No. 3 in E major, BWV 1006

Selected arrangements and transcriptions
J. S. Bach, Transcription for keyboard, organ and lute of various movements, some of them later attributed to Bach's pupils. The pieces for keyboard appear in the Miscellaneous Keyboard Works, Bach Gesellschaft Edition, 1853 (reissued by Dover Publications).
Fugue in D minor, BWV 539/ii (BWV 1001/ii) for organ
Fugue in G minor, BWV 1000 (BWV 1001/ii) for lute
Suite in E major, BWV 1006a (BWV 1006) for lute or keyboard
Sonata in D minor, BWV 964 (BWV 1003, doubtful) for keyboard
Adagio in G major, BWV 968 (from BWV 1005, doubtful) for keyboard
Chaconne, BWV 1004.
Johannes Brahms, piano left hand
Ferruccio Busoni, piano solo
William Thomas Best, organ
Henri Messerer, organ
Matthias Keller, organ, Carus-Verlag, 2011
Arno Landmann, organ, Simrock Verlag
Preludio, BWV 1006
J. S. Bach, Sinfonia in BWV 29, a reworking of the Preludio from BWV 1006 for obbligato organ, trumpets, oboes and strings
Various arrangements for organ of the sinfonia, including the versions by Alexandre Guilmant, Marcel Dupré and Friedemann Winklhofer (Hans Sikorski)
British lutenist Nigel North transcribed the entire sequence for lute, as well as Bach's Cello Suites and recorded them on four CDs for Linn Records (volumes 1 to 4, respectively CKD 013, CKD 029, CKD 049, CKD 055)

ى==Selected recordings==

Classical violin
Joseph Szigeti, 1931 (selected for the NARAS Hall of Fame) and 1956
Yehudi Menuhin, 1934–1944 and 1957 and 1975
George Enescu, 1948
Jascha Heifetz, 1952
Henryk Szeryng, 1954 and 1967
Emil Telmányi, 1954
Nathan Milstein, 1956 and 1973
Arthur Grumiaux, 1961, included on the Voyager Golden Record
Gidon Kremer, 1980 and 2005
Oscar Shumsky, 1983
Shlomo Mintz, 1984
Itzhak Perlman, 1988
Ida Haendel, 1995
Salvatore Accardo, 1996
Vanessa-Mae, 1996
Dmitry Sitkovetsky, 1997
James Ehnes, 2000
Christian Tetzlaff, 1993, 2006 and 2017
Viktoria Mullova, 2009
Isabelle Faust, 2010–2012
Gil Shaham, 2014
Kyung Wha Chung, 2016
Julia Fischer, 2017 (Re-release)
Hilary Hahn, 1997 and 2018
Milan Pala, 2018

Baroque violin
Sergiu Luca, 1977
Sigiswald Kuijken, 1981
Jaap Schröder, 1984–1985
Lucy van Dael, 1996
Rachel Podger, 1997–1999
Elizabeth Wallfisch, 1997
Monica Huggett, 1997
Ingrid Matthews, 2000
Hélène Schmitt, 2004
John Holloway, 2006
Alina Ibragimova, 2009
Stanley Ritchie, 2013 
Giuliano Carmignola, 2018

Violoncello
Tanya Anisimova, 2001

Keyboard
Robert Hill, 1999

Mandolin

Chris Thile, 2013
Avi Avital, 2019

Notes

References

 . Preface by Peter Wollny, pages VIII–XII.

Further reading

 and  published a book (2017) about Bach's Chaconne: Excerpts from Eternity – The Purification of Time and Character, the Fulfilment of Love and Cooperation with the Celestial Will in Johann Sebastian Bach's Ciaccona for Violin. 
, Part of the preface
 Bachmann, Alberto (1925) An Encyclopedia of the violin, Da Capo, .

 

  (a reprint of a 1985 publication in Early Music)

External links 

 
 Digitised copy of autograph manuscript (1720) at the Bach Archive, Leipzig.
 Free sheet music of all six works from Cantorion.org
 MIDI Sequences of Bach's Violin Sonatas/Partitas
 Sonatas and Partitas for solo violin Vito Paternoster – MP3 Creative Commons Recording, played on cello
 
 Violinists talk about their approach to Sonatas and Partitas for Solo Violin
From liner notes of a Benedict Cruft recording
Discussion of recording history
Recordings of the Sonatas and Partitas in the 1950s at Enesco's Profile at The Remington Site
Discussion of publishing history and Second Sonata
Free Bach Violin Sheet Music With bowing and fingering instructions.
Music for Glass Orchestra by Grace Andreacchi, a novel that contains an extensive analysis of the Sonatas and partitas for Solo Violin.
Bach's Chaconne in D minor for solo violin: An application through analysis by Larry Solomon
Violinist and author Arnold Steinhardt discusses his lifelong quest to master the chaconne; interesting interview, good links
In the BBC Discovering Music: Listening Library

Suites by Johann Sebastian Bach
Sonatas by Johann Sebastian Bach
Bach
1720 compositions